Claudia Uhle (born 15 March 1976) is a German singer, known for being a member of X-Perience.

Early life 
Uhle was born in Johannisthal in East Berlin. She first learned the flute and the piano before practicing singing. She attended the Georg-Friedrich-Händel-Oberschule in Berlin, a special music school. During school she sang in various choirs, as a teenager she sang at the Berlin State Opera.

Career 
In 1995, Uhle joined the pop-style group X-Perience, in which her brother Matthias was already evolving. The band found success in 1996 with the song A Neverending Dream.

In 2007, Claudia left the band to better focus on her solo project, Angelzoom. In 2020, Uhle got back together with X-Perience.

Discography

Albums 

 2004: Angelzoom
 2010: Nothing is Infinite

Singles 

 2004: Fairyland
 2005: Back in the Moment (feat. Joachim Witt)
 2010: The Things You Said
 2011: Everyone Cares
 2013: A Lily of the Valley
 2014: Lascia Ch'io Pianga - The Dark Tenor

References 

1976 births
Living people
People from East Berlin
Eurodance musicians
20th-century German women singers

21st-century German women singers